Secondary fermentation is a process commonly associated with winemaking, which entails a second period of fermentation in a different vessel than the one used to start the fermentation process. An example of this would be starting fermentation in a carboy or stainless steel tank and then moving it over to oak barrels. Rather than being a separate, second fermentation, this is most often one single fermentation period that is conducted in multiple vessels. However, the term does also apply to procedures that could be described as a second and distinct fermentation period.

In wine production

In sparkling wine production, the secondary fermentation often takes places in the wine bottle that the wine will be sold in. This is most commonly known as the méthode champenoise or "Champagne method" after the region most noted for sparkling wine production. When the base wine (or cuvee) has been produced from single grape varietals or a blend, the wine is bottled with a mixture of yeast and fresh sugar known as the "liqueur de tirage". This secondary fermentation, also known as bottle fermentation, is the process that makes the wine "bubbly" due to the containment of carbon dioxide which is normally released as a by product in regular fermentation. 

In still wine production, particularly of red wines and some white wines like Chardonnay, the secondary fermentation process can also usher in the use of malolactic fermentation (or MLF) where the hard, green apple-like malic acid is converted into softer, butter-like lactic acid. In the case of a stuck fermentation, a winemaker may wish to transfer the must to a second vessel and use stronger, more aggressive yeasts with high fermentation temperatures to re-initiate the fermentation process. A similar process known as governo has been used by Tuscan winemakers since the 14th century with the isolation after harvest of a batch of grapes that can be added later to the wine to help prevent (or recover from) a stuck fermentation.

See also
Glossary of wine terms

References

Further reading
 American Journal of Enology and Viticulture "Studies on the Secondary Fermentation of Low-Alcohol Sparkling Apple Wine" 44:1:93-98 (1993)
Jeff Cox "From Vines to Wines: The Complete Guide to Growing Grapes and Making Your Own Wine" Storey Publishing 1999 
 SQ Liu  "Malolactic fermentation in wine - beyond deacidification" - Journal of Applied Microbiology, 2002 Volume 92 Issue 4 Page 589-601
William Patton "The laws of fermentation and the wines of the ancients" University of Michigan Publishing 2005

External links
 Winemaking basics "Transfer to secondary"

Winemaking